Christian Lechtaler (born February 10, 1972) is a retired Swedish professional ice hockey centre, and currently president for Frölunda HC in the Swedish Hockey League.

External links

1972 births
Living people
Swedish ice hockey centres
Frölunda HC players
Gothiques d'Amiens players
IF Björklöven players
Ice hockey people from Gothenburg